Byrne & Co v Leon Van Tien Hoven & Co [1880] 5 CPD 344 is a leading English contract law case on the issue of revocation in relation to the postal rule. In it Lindley J of the High Court's Common Pleas Division ruled that an offer is only revoked by direct communication with the offeree, and that the postal rule does not apply in revocation; while simply posting a letter counts as a valid acceptance, it does not count as valid revocation.

Facts
Van Tienhoven & Co posted a letter from their office in Cardiff to Byrne & Co in New York City, offering 1000 boxes of tinplates for sale on 1 October. Byrne and Co got the letter on 11 October. They telegraphed acceptance on the same day. But on 8 October Van Tienhoven had sent another letter withdrawing their offer, because tinplate prices had just risen 25%. They refused to go through with the sale.

Consequences
Lindley J held that the withdrawal of the offer was not effective until it was communicated. His judgment stated the following:

Lindley's judgment notes in part that the postal rule cases which he reviewed include an express or implied consent by an offeror to treat an answer duly sent by post as an acceptance.

Rule of law
Revocation of an offer must be received and understood by the offeree before it comes into effect. An acceptance by the offeree before they receive notice of the revocation will be considered valid.

See also
Adams v Lindsell [1818] B & Ald 681
Dickinson v Dodds [1876] 2 Ch D 463
Henthorn v Fraser [1892] 2 Ch 27

Notes and references

English agreement case law
Lord Lindley cases
1880 in case law
1880 in British law
High Court of Justice cases